Daniel Harold Rolling (May 26, 1954 – October 25, 2006), known as the Gainesville Ripper, was an American serial killer. He murdered five students in Gainesville, Florida, over four days in August 1990. Rolling later confessed to raping several of his victims, committing a triple homicide in his home city of Shreveport, Louisiana, and attempting to murder his father in May 1990. In total, Rolling confessed to killing eight people. He was sentenced to death for the five Gainesville murders in 1994. He was executed by lethal injection in 2006.

Early years 
Danny Rolling was born in Shreveport, Louisiana. His father was a Shreveport police officer named James Rolling, who told Danny that he was unwanted from birth. James also abused and beat Danny, Danny's mother Claudia, and his brother Kevin for frivolous things, such as breathing in a way that displeased him. In one incident, Danny's mother went to the hospital after claiming her husband tried to make her cut herself with a razor blade. She made repeated attempts to leave her husband, but always returned shortly. In one example of the senior Rolling's sense of discipline, he pinned Danny to the ground and handcuffed him, then had police take his son away because he was embarrassed by him. In another story, Danny had a dog, but James beat the dog so often that it died in Danny's arms.

As a teenager and young adult, Rolling was arrested several times for robberies in Georgia, and was caught spying on a woman getting dressed. As an adult, he had trouble trying to assimilate into society and hold down a steady job. At one point, Rolling worked as a waiter at Pancho's restaurant in Bossier City, Louisiana.

Serial killings 
In August 1990, Rolling murdered five students (one student from Santa Fe College, and four from the University of Florida) during a burglary and robbery spree in Gainesville, Florida. He mutilated his victims' bodies, decapitating one. He then posed them, sometimes using mirrors.

In the early morning hours of Friday, August 24, Rolling broke into the apartment shared by 17-year-old university freshmen Sonja Larson and Christina Powell. Finding Powell asleep on the downstairs couch, he stood over her briefly but did not wake her up, choosing instead to explore the upstairs bedroom where Larson was also asleep. Rolling murdered Larson, first taping her mouth shut to stifle her screams, and then stabbing her to death with a Ka-Bar knife. She died trying to fend him off.

Rolling then went back downstairs, taped Powell's mouth shut, bound her wrists together behind her back and threatened her with the knife as he cut her clothes off. He then raped her and forced her face-down onto the floor, where he stabbed her five times in the back. Rolling posed the bodies in sexually provocative positions. He took a shower before leaving the apartment.

A day later, on Saturday, August 25, Rolling broke into the apartment of 18-year-old Christa Hoyt, prying open a sliding glass door with a screwdriver. Finding she was not home, he waited in the living room for her to return. At 11 a.m., Hoyt entered the apartment and Rolling surprised her from behind, placing her in a chokehold. After she had been subdued, he used duct tape to gag her mouth and bind her wrists together behind her back and led her into the bedroom, where he cut the clothes from her body and raped her. As in the Powell murder, he forced her to lie face-down onto the bed and stabbed her in the back, rupturing her aorta. He then flipped her body over and sliced her abdomen open from her pubic bone to her breastbone. After arriving back at his campsite, Rolling could not find his wallet. Thinking he may have lost it at the murder scene, he returned there, at which time he decapitated Hoyt, posed her body in a sitting position at the edge of her bed and placed her head on a shelf facing the corpse. He later claimed his intent was to add to the shock of whoever discovered her.

By this point, the murders had attracted widespread media attention. Many students had begun taking extra precautions, such as changing their daily routines and sleeping together in groups. Because the spree was happening so early in the fall semester, some students withdrew their enrollment or transferred to other schools. Tracy Paules, who was 23 years old, was living with her roommate Manny Taboada, also 23. On Monday, August 27, Rolling broke into their apartment by prying open their sliding glass door with the same tools he had used previously. Rolling found Taboada asleep in one of the bedrooms, and killed him after a struggle. 

Hearing the commotion, Paules went down the hall to Taboada's bedroom and saw Rolling. She attempted to barricade herself in her bedroom, but Rolling broke through the door. Rolling taped her mouth and wrists, cut off her clothing and raped her, before turning her over and stabbing her three times in the back. Rolling posed Paules' body but left Taboada's in the same position in which he had died.

With the exception of Taboada, all of the victims were petite white brunettes with brown eyes, like Rolling's mother. Although law enforcement initially had very few leads, police did identify two suspects. One suspect was Edward Lewis Humphrey, a University of Florida student who had a history of mental illness and bore numerous scars on his face from a car accident. Humphrey was arrested after a physical altercation with his grandmother and held in custody for five months, until a grand jury refused to indict him on the murder charges citing insufficient evidence. Humphrey's photo was shown repeatedly by media outlets. Authorities publicly cleared him of all charges after Rolling's arrest. The other suspect was also later cleared.

Shreveport murders and tip about Rolling 
Louisiana police alerted Florida authorities to an unsolved triple murder in Shreveport on November 4, 1989. Detectives noted that there were similarities between the Gainesville murders and those of 55-year-old Tom Grissom, his 24-year-old daughter Julie, and his 8-year-old grandson Sean. The family had been attacked in their home as they were preparing for dinner. Afterwards, Julie Grissom's body had been mutilated, cleaned, and posed. 

Don Maines, an investigator on the case with the Florida Department of Law Enforcement, traveled to Shreveport in November 1990, because of similarities between the murders committed in Gainesville and murders committed in Shreveport. They included: posing of the victims; tape residue on victim's body; and vinegar used to clean the body. Maines said they tested the body fluids from the perpetrator in Shreveport and found that this person also had type B blood. He called the match to the evidence in Gainesville a "revelation" in the case.

Shortly after Maines' trip to Shreveport, a Shreveport resident, Cindy Juracich, called Crime Stoppers and reported that Danny Rolling was possibly connected to the murders in both cities. Three months earlier, in August 1990, Juracich heard a news report about a string of murders, as she traveled through the Florida Panhandle. The report made her think about Rolling, whom she had met at her Louisiana hometown church, and his possible link to these three other Shreveport murders. Rolling had said deeply disturbing things to both her and her then-husband, Steven Dobbin. "He'd come over every night for a while, and then one night, Steven came in and he goes, 'He's got to go,'" Juracich said. She also said that Dobbin told her that Rolling had told him he had a problem. "I said, 'What kind of problem,'" Juracich said, "[and Steven said], 'He likes to stick knives into people.'" Juracich said she dismissed these comments when she heard about them because she didn't want to believe Rolling could be responsible for the murders in Shreveport. Rolling had also told her, "'One day, I'm going to leave this town and I'm going to go where the girls are beautiful and I can just lay in the sun and watch beautiful women all day'". 

News of the Gainesville murders haunted Juracich, so she finally contacted police in November, based on her hunch about Rolling's connection to the murders in both cities. "It would not let me rest," she said. "One day, I picked up the phone, I called Crime Stoppers, and I said, 'I think there's one guy y'all need to investigate -- Danny Rolling.'"

Investigators responded to the tip and quickly found Rolling, who had been arrested on September 7, 1990, for an Ocala, Florida, supermarket robbery. The robbery had been committed ten days after the bodies of Paules and Taboada were found. Rolling was being held in the Marion County Jail 40 miles south of Gainesville. Investigators determined that Rolling had type B blood, like the suspect in both the Gainesville and Shreveport murders. 

Once Florida investigators realized that Rolling had multiple convictions for armed robbery, they realized he could have also been responsible for the bank robbery that occurred on the day Christa Hoyt's body was found. They returned to the evidence locker, where the gun, screwdriver, bag of money, and cassette player had been stored, and listened to the tape. They also found tools matching marks left at the Gainesville murder scenes. The small camp where he had been living was in a wooded area near apartment complexes frequented by students; investigators discovered audio diaries he had made there alluding to the crimes.

Later it was discovered that on August 5, 1990, Rolling broke into the home of Janet Frake in Sarasota, Florida. He bound and gagged her with duct tape while he sexually assaulted her, but did not kill her.

Charges and trial 
In November 1991, Rolling was charged with five counts of murder. He was brought to trial nearly four years after the murders. He claimed his motive was to become a "superstar" similar to Ted Bundy. In 1994, before his trial could get underway, Rolling unexpectedly pleaded guilty to all charges. Subsequently, State Attorney Rod Smith presented the penalty phase of the prosecution. During his trial, Court TV conducted an interview with Rolling's mother from her home, during which his father could be heard shouting off-camera. 

On April 20, 1994, Rolling was sentenced to death. Rolling was diagnosed with antisocial personality disorder, borderline personality disorder, and paraphilia.

Execution
Shortly before he was executed in Florida for the series of killings in Gainesville, Rolling claimed responsibility for the Shreveport murders, handing his spiritual adviser Reverend Mike Hudspeth and Florida police a handwritten confession and apology. Rolling had a last meal of lobster tail. He sang a gospel hymn, but made no statement immediately before his execution, which was witnessed by many of his victims' relatives. 

Rolling was executed by lethal injection at Florida State Prison on October 25, 2006, after the U.S. Supreme Court rejected a last-ditch appeal. He was pronounced dead at 6:13 p.m EDT.

In media 

Rolling has been the subject of several written works. His crime spree inspired screenwriter Kevin Williamson to pen the script of the 1996 slasher film Scream.

Sondra London collaborated with Rolling on The Making of a Serial Killer: The True Story of the Gainesville Murders in the Killer's Own Words. Rolling's relationship with London, which developed while he was behind bars, was the focus of an episode of Errol Morris' First Person. Rolling and London became romantically involved, eventually even becoming engaged. The series overviewed their romance, his artwork, and his supposed feelings of remorse over the crimes he committed. It also included a segment of Rolling using one of his hearings as an opportunity to publicly display his affection, serenading London in the courtroom. 

A 2007 independent feature film titled The Gainesville Ripper, based on accounts of the killings, was shot in the Gainesville and Jacksonville, Florida areas. In the film, Rolling is portrayed by Zachary Memos.  

Rolling was also the subject of an episode of Body of Evidence: From the Case Files of Dayle Hinman, a Court TV show (transmitted as Crime Scene USA: Body of Evidence on Discovery Channel in the UK) and an episode of Forensic Factor titled Killing Spree, which originally aired on Discovery Channel Canada and was rebroadcast in America on the Science Channel. 

Rolling was the subject of a 2010 episode of Cold Blood, and briefly was mentioned in a 2012 episode of Motives and Murders titled "Not Again". He was featured in a 2015 episode of Nightmare Next Door.

In 2013, TV documentary series The Real Story aired an episode profiling the movie Scream. It aired July 28, 2013, and tells the story of Rolling's murders in graphic detail. 

The book Drifter is based on the 1990 Gainesville murders. The song Harold Rollings Hymn from the 2007 John 5 album, The Devil Knows My Name is inspired by Rolling. 

An episode of Murder Made Me Famous, which aired November 24, 2018, chronicled the case.

The premiere episode of Mark of a Killer, titled "Posed to Kill", documented the case.

In 2020, WUFT News released a television special and podcast special chronicling thoughts on the case 30 years later, titled Four Days, Five Murders.

In 2021, an episode of the ABC primetime true crime television series 20/20 aired the murder case.

On January 14, 2022, Discovery+ premiered the paranormal documentary Scream: The True Story, starring Steve Shippy and Cindy Kaza. Shippy and Kaza conduct a paranormal investigation in Rolling's childhood home in Shreveport, Louisiana.

While on death row at Florida State Prison, Rolling wrote songs and poems and drew pictures. His works are an example of murderabilia.

See also 
 2022 University of Idaho killings, four university roommates killed in Idaho
Ted Bundy, killed university sorority house roommates in Florida
Ma Jiajue, killed four university roommates in China
Elliot Rodger, stabbed to death roommates near university in California
 List of people executed in Florida
 List of people executed in the United States in 2006
 List of serial killers in the United States

References

External links 

Danny Rolling, Gainesville Ripper. Crime Library. Retrieved on November 14, 2007.
Profile of Daniel Harold Rolling at About.com

Inmate Release Information Detail - Inmate 521178. Florida Department of Corrections.

1954 births
2006 deaths
1989 murders in the United States
1990 murders in the United States
20th-century American criminals
21st-century executions by Florida
21st-century executions of American people
American male criminals
American murderers of children
American rapists
American spree killers
Crime in Florida
Criminals from Louisiana
Executed American serial killers
Executed people from Louisiana
Executed spree killers
Family murders
Male serial killers
People convicted of murder by Florida
People executed by Florida by lethal injection
People from Shreveport, Louisiana
People with antisocial personality disorder
People with borderline personality disorder